Hill Mansion is a historic home located at Culpeper, Culpeper County, Virginia. It was built in 1857–1858, and is a two-story, four bay, brick dwelling in the Italianate style.  It measures 39 feet by 38 feet, 7 inches, and rests on a high brick foundation. The front facade features a one-story porch consisting of an arcade, supported on Tuscan order piers, with a bracketed cornice.  It was the home of Edward Baptist Hill, whose brother, General A. P. Hill, was a frequent visitor during the American Civil War. It also served as a Confederate hospital and later as headquarters for Union officers.

It was listed on the National Register of Historic Places in 1980.  It is included in the South East Street Historic District.

References

Houses on the National Register of Historic Places in Virginia
Italianate architecture in Virginia
Houses completed in 1858
Houses in Culpeper County, Virginia
National Register of Historic Places in Culpeper County, Virginia
Individually listed contributing properties to historic districts on the National Register in Virginia
Gilded Age mansions